The Curia of Hungary (Hungarian: Kúria), also known as the Supreme Court of Hungary (Magyarország Legfelsőbb Bírósága) before 2011 is the Supreme Court and highest judicial authority of Hungary. The Curia was founded in 1949 as the People's Republic of Hungary Supreme Court. It was preceded by the Royal Curia of the Kingdom of Hungary. The current president of the court is András Zsolt Varga.

Presidents

Legfelsőbb Bíróság (1949–2012)
Somogyi Ödön (1949–1950)
Jankó Péter (1950–1953)
Molnár Erik (1953–1954)
Domokos József (1954–1958)
Jahner-Bakos Mihály (1958–1963)
Szalay József (1963–1968)
Szakács Ödön (1968–1980)
Szilbereky Jenő (1980–1990)
Solt Pál (1990–2002)
Lomnici Zoltán (2002–2008)
Baka András (2009–2011)

Kúria (2012–)
Darák Péter (2012–2021)
Varga Zsolt András (2021–)

See also
Curia Regia
Constitutional Court of Hungary

External links
Official website of the Curia of Hungary (English)
History of Curia (Hungarian)

References

Law of Hungary
Legal history of Hungary
Hungary
1949 establishments in Hungary
Courts and tribunals established in 1949
Belváros-Lipótváros